The German Individual Speedway Championship is a Motorcycle speedway championship held each year to determine the German national champion.

History
Before the German reunification champions of West Germany and East Germany were declared.

West Germany
1969-1990

Before 1979 the West German Individual Championship was known as the German Track Championship & was held on Grasstrack & Long tracks only

East Germany
1962-1991

Germany
Post 1990

See also
 Sport in Germany

References

Germany
Speedway competitions in Germany